Barton-upon-Irwell was, from 1894 to 1933, a rural district in the administrative county of Lancashire, England.

History
The rural district was created by the Local Government Act 1894 as successor to Barton-upon-Irwell Rural Sanitary District, formed in 1875. In 1920 the boundary of the district was adjusted to reflect a change in county boundaries, and it exchanged areas with Bucklow Rural District, Cheshire.

Civil parishes and boundaries
The rural district consisted of four civil parishes: 
Barton Moss
Clifton
Davyhulme
Flixton

The district formed two distinct areas: to the south the parishes of Barton Moss, Davyhulme and Flixton were surrounded to the north by Worsley Urban District and the Borough of Eccles; to the east by the County Borough of Salford; to the south by Urmston Urban District and by the boundary with Cheshire and to the west by Irlam Urban District. The parish of Clifton was a detached exclave to the north adjacent to the urban districts of Kearsley and Swinton and Pendlebury.

Abolition
The rural district was abolished on 1 April 1933. Two county review orders: the Lancashire (Manchester and district) Review Order and the Lancashire (Southern Areas) Review Order transferred the district's area to four neighbouring towns: Barton Moss passed to the Borough of Eccles, Clifton to Kearsley Urban District, Davyhulme to Stretford Urban District and Flixton to Urmston Urban District.

References

Districts of England created by the Local Government Act 1894
History of Lancashire
History of Greater Manchester
Rural districts of England